Elysian Airlines is a cargo airline based at Yaoundé Nsimalen International Airport in Yaoundé, Cameroon, and had additional significant operations at Spriggs Payne Airport in Monrovia, Liberia, and at Conakry International Airport in Conakry, Guinea. According to the airline's website, it was founded in January 2006 as a public limited company, with 51% of shares held by a Cameroonian consortium and the remainder owned by a British/South African group. Elysian's scheduled operations stopped in 2010, but resumed in 2015.

Elysian Airlines began with a domestic network in Cameroon, but has since expanded rapidly westward. As of November 2008, the airline offered an extensive network of international services across West Africa, as well as a spread of domestic flights within several countries. The airline also offers charter services. Services restarted in 2015, using a Bae 146 for schedule routes as well as charter. An Airbus A310F was purchased in 2015 and is used for Cargo services in Africa, Europe and the Middle East.

Destinations
 (Douala, Garoua, Maroua, Ngaoundéré, Yaoundé)
 (Abidjan)
 (Banjul)
 (Conakry, Kankan, Kissidougou, Labé, Nzerekore, Siguiri)
 (Greenville, Harper, Monrovia (Spriggs Payne), Zwedru)
 (Dakar)
 (Bo, Freetown, Hastings, Kenema, Makeni)

Fleet
The Elysian Airlines fleet consists of the following aircraft (as of August 2016):

The airline previously operated a further three British Aerospace 146 aircraft and an Airbus A310.

References

External links

Airlines of Cameroon
Airlines established in 2006